Pleurotomella allisoni is a species of sea snail, a marine gastropod mollusk in the family Raphitomidae.

Description
The length (incomplete) of the shell attains 17.6 mm, its diameter 6.6 mm.

Distribution
This marine species occurs on Mid-Pacific Seamounts between the Marshall Islands and Hawaii at depths between 1582 m and 1617 m.

References

 Rehder H. A. & Ladd H. S. (1973) Deep and shallow-water mollusks from the Central Pacific. Science Reports of the Tohoku University, Sendai, ser. 2 (Geology) Special vol. 6 (Hatai Memorial Volume): 37-49, pl. 3. [25 February 1973 page(s): 46]

External links
 Gastropods.com: Pleurotomella allisoni
 

allisoni
Gastropods described in 1973